The 2014 United States House of Representatives elections in South Carolina was held on Tuesday, November 4, 2014, to elect the 7 U.S. representatives from the state of South Carolina, one from each of the state's 7 congressional districts. The elections coincided with the elections of other federal and state offices, including Governor of South Carolina.

Overview

By district
Results of the 2014 United States House of Representatives elections in South Carolina by district:

District 1

The 1st district is located on the Atlantic coastal plain, from Seabrook Island to the border with North Carolina and includes most of Charleston and Myrtle Beach. The incumbent is Republican Mark Sanford, who has represented the district since 2013, and previously from 1995 to 2001. He was elected with 54% of the vote in a special election in 2013 and the district has a PVI of R+11.

He ran for re-election unopposed.

General election

Results

District 2

The 2nd district is located in central South Carolina. The incumbent is Republican Joe Wilson, who has represented the district since 2001. He was re-elected with 96% of the vote in 2012 and the district has a PVI of R+16.

Eddie McCain, who was the Libertarian nominee for the seat in 2010, challenged Wilson for the Republican nomination.

Ed Greenleaf and Phil Black ran for the Democratic nomination.
Harold Geddings III of the Labor Party is also running.

Primary election

Republican primary

Democratic primary

General election

Results

District 3

The 3rd district is located in western South Carolina. The incumbent is Republican Jeff Duncan, who has represented the district since 2011. He was re-elected with 67% of the vote in 2012 and the district has a PVI of R+18.

Hosea Cleveland and Barbara Jo Mullis ran for the Democratic nomination.

Democratic primary

General election

Results

District 4

The 4th district is located in Upstate South Carolina. The incumbent is Republican Trey Gowdy, who has represented the district since 2011. He was re-elected with 65% of the vote in 2012 and the district has a PVI of R+15.

Libertarian Curtis E. McLaughlin was the only other candidate running.

General election

Results

District 5

The 5th district is located in northern South Carolina. The incumbent is Republican Mick Mulvaney, who has represented the district since 2011. He was re-elected with 56% of the vote in 2012 and the district has a PVI of R+9.

Fort Mill Town Councilman Tom Adams ran for the Democrats.

General election

Results

District 6

The 6th district is located in central and southwestern South Carolina. The incumbent is Democrat Jim Clyburn, who has represented the district since 1993. He was re-elected with 94% of the vote in 2012 and the district has a PVI of D+21.

Karen Smith challenged Clyburn for the Democratic nomination.

Anthony Culler and Leon Winn ran for the Republican nomination

Kevin R. Umbaugh was the Libertarian nominee (Kevin R. Umbaugh, primary)

Primary election

Democratic primary

Republican primary

General election

Results

District 7

The 7th district is located in northeastern South Carolina. The incumbent is Republican Tom Rice, who has represented this newly created district since 2013. He was elected with 56% of the vote in 2012 and the district has a PVI of R+7.

Economist and nominee for the seat in 2012 Gloria Bromell Tinubu ran for the Democrats.

General election

Results

See also
 2014 United States House of Representatives elections
 2014 United States elections

References

External links
U.S. House elections in South Carolina, 2014 at Ballotpedia
Campaign contributions at OpenSecrets

United States House of Representatives
South Carolina
2014